Acalypha psilostachya is a species in the botanical family Euphorbiaceae. In East Africa it is used as a medicinal plant.

Geographic distribution 
Acalypha psilostachya occurs throughout East Africa and in southern Africa it occurs in Malawi, Zambia, Mozambique and Angola.

References

External links 
PROTA4U on Acalypha psilostachya

psilostachya
Plants used in traditional African medicine